The North European Plain ( – North German Plain; ;  – Central European Plain;  and  ; French : Plaine d'Europe du Nord) is a geomorphological region in Europe that covers all or parts of Belgium, the Netherlands (i.e. the Low Countries), Germany, Denmark, and Poland.

It consists of the low plains between the Hercynian Europe (Central European Highlands) to the south and coastlines of the North Sea and the Baltic Sea to the north. These two seas are separated by the Jutland Peninsula (Denmark). The North European Plain is connected to the East European Plain, together forming the majority of the Great European Plain (European Plain).

Geography
Elevations vary between 0 and 200 m (0 to about 650 ft). While mostly used as farmland, the region also contains bogs, heath and lakes.
The Wadden Sea, a large tidal area, is located on the North Sea coast.

A number of freshwater lagoons including the Szczecin Lagoon, the Vistula Lagoon and the Curonian Lagoon are found on the Baltic Sea coast.

Location
The North European Plain covers Flanders (northern Belgium and Northern France), the Netherlands, Northern Germany, Denmark, and most of central-western Poland; it touches the Czech Republic and southwestern part of Sweden as well. 

Parts of eastern England can also be considered part of the same plain; as they share its low-lying character and were connected by land to the continent during the last ice age. The Northern European Plains are located also under the Baltic Sea.

Rivers
Major river-drainage basins include, from west to east: the
Rhine, Ems, Weser, Elbe, Oder and Vistula.

The bases of these rivers are heavy with thin soil, making it hard for the farming to thrive near these rivers.

Sub-regions

Low Countries
Historically, especially in the Middle Ages and Early modern period, the western section has been known as the Low Countries.

North German Plain
The North German Plain is located north of the Central Uplands of Germany.

Polish Plain
The part in modern-day Poland is called the "Polish Plain" ( or Nizina Polska) and stretches from the Baltic Sea in the north to the Sudetes and Carpathians

English flatlands
The extension of the plain into England consists mainly of the flatlands of East Anglia, the Fens and Lincolnshire, where the landscape is in parts strikingly similar to that of the Netherlands.

See also
 Geography of Germany
 Geography of Poland

External links
Baltic Lagoons
Lowlands-L, an international discussion community dealing with the North European Plain, its cultures, language varieties, history, etc.; also dealing with Lowlands-based heritage in Britain, North America, Australia, etc.
 Clickable map (in Russian)

European Plain
Plains of Europe
Geography of Europe
Physiographic provinces

sv:Nordtyska låglandet
zh:北德平原